The Orto Botanico dell'Università di Lecce (2 hectares), also known as the Orto Botanico di Lecce, is a botanical garden operated by the University of Lecce and located at Via Provinciale Lecce-Monteroni, 73100, Lecce, Apulia, Italy.

Although Lecce's earliest botanical garden dates to 1814, it began an irreversible decline in 1866 after its acquisition by the province, and today's garden is a separate undertaking begun in 1994 by the university's biology department. It currently contains several hundred species.

See also 
 List of botanical gardens in Italy

References 
 Botanical Garden University of Salento 
 S. Marchiori, "L'Orto Botanico di Lecce", Museol. Sci., XII (1-2): 143–148, 1995.
 Gruppo Italiano per la Ricerca sulle Orchidee Spontanee (GIROS), Notiziario per i Soci, September 2002, no 21. PDF

Botanical gardens in Italy
Buildings and structures in Lecce
Gardens in Apulia
Lecce
University of Salento